Love Explosion is the fourth solo studio album by Tina Turner, released late 1979 on the EMI label in Europe, Ariola Records in West Germany and United Artists Records in the UK. Italy and South Africa followed in early 1980. The album was not released in the United States. It was her second solo album released after she left husband Ike Turner and the Ike & Tina Turner Revue. Love Explosion failed to chart, so Turner lost her recording contract. It would be her last album until the critically acclaimed Private Dancer in 1984.

Recording and release
Love Explosion was recorded mainly in London (the brass recorded in New York) and was produced by one of the leading characters in French disco at the time, Alec R. Costandinos, who had written hits for Demis Roussos and worked with bands like Love And Kisses and Cerrone and also appeared on the soundtrack to the 1978 movie Thank God It's Friday. The album features heavy influences of funk and disco.

The track listing includes two soul ballads, "I See Home" and "Just A Little Lovin'", the former originally recorded by Patti LaBelle on her 1978 album Tasty and the latter originally recorded by Dusty Springfield on her 1969 album Dusty in Memphis. The disco track "Love Explosion" was released as a single in Australia, while "Music Keeps Me Dancin'" was released in Europe. It is the only song Turner has been known to ever perform from the album as it was included in her European live tour earlier in the year. A mid-tempo cover of The O'Jays' 1972 soul classic "Backstabbers" was released as a promotional single in the UK. Because the singles and the album failed to chart, United Artists Records and Turner parted ways.

Reissues 
After the success of Turner's Private Dancer album, Ariola re-released Love Explosion in September 1984. The album was re-issued on CD by EMI in the early 1990s, but is currently out of print.

Track listing

Personnel
Tina Turner – vocals
Jean-Claude Chavanat - guitar
Tony Bonfils – bass guitar
Bernard Arcadio – keyboards
André Ceccarelli – drums
Emmanuel "Manu" Roche – percussion
George Young, Lawrence Feldman, Michael Brecker – tenor saxophone
Lew Del Gatto – baritone saxophone
Barry Rogers, David Taylor, Tom Malone, Wayne Andre – trombone
Alan Rubin, Randy Brecker – trumpet
George Marge – oboe
Arthur Simms, Stephanie de Sykes, Stevie Lange, Vicki Brown – background vocals
The Pat Halling String Ensemble – strings
Georges Rodi – synthesizer, programming

Production
 Produced by Alec R. Costandinos
 Engineers: Mike Ross-Trevor, Scott Litt, Geoff Calver, Peter R. Kelsey
 Arranged and conducted by Raymond T. Knehnestky
 Rhythm tracks recorded at Trident Studios (London); Vocals at CBS Studios (London); Strings, Backing Vocals and Synthesizers recorded at Red Bus Studios (London); Brass recorded at Power Station Studios (New York)
 Remixed at Trident Studios, London by Peter R. Kelsey
 "Love Explosion" and "Sunset on Sunset" recorded at Trident Studios, London
 "On the Radio" remixed at Red Bus Studios, London
 Design: RIA Images
 Photography: Claude Mougin

References

Tina Turner albums
1979 albums
United Artists Records albums
Disco albums by American artists
EMI Records albums
Ariola Records albums